DLAB may refer to:
 Defense Language Aptitude Battery, a test used by the United States Department of Defense to test an individual's potential for learning a foreign language
 DLab, Italian video game school